This is a list of members of the South Australian Legislative Council between 1982 and 1985. As half of the Legislative Council's terms expired at each state election, half of these members were elected at the 1979 state election with terms expiring in 1985, while the other half were elected at the 1982 state election with terms expiring in 1989.

 Labor MLC Frank Blevins resigned on 15 November 1985 in order to contest the Legislative Assembly seat of Giles at the 1985 state election. Due to the proximity of the election, the parliament expired before the casual vacancy could be filled, and George Weatherill was duly appointed to serve out the remaining four years of Blevins' term by the new parliament in 1986.

References

 "Statistical Record of the Legislature, 1837–2007", Parliament of South Australia, 2007.
 "History of South Australian Elections, 1857–2006", Dean Jaensch, 2006.

Members of South Australian parliaments by term
20th-century Australian politicians